Erissus is a genus of South American crab spiders that was first described by Eugène Louis Simon in 1895.

Species
 it contains ten species, found in Venezuela, Peru, and Brazil:
Erissus angulosus Simon, 1895 – Brazil
Erissus bateae Soares, 1941 – Brazil
Erissus bilineatus Mello-Leitão, 1929 – Brazil
Erissus fuscus Simon, 1929 – Peru, Brazil
Erissus mirabilis (Soares, 1942) – Brazil
Erissus roseus Mello-Leitão, 1943 – Brazil
Erissus sanctaeleopoldinae (Soares & Soares, 1946) – Brazil
Erissus spinosissimus Mello-Leitão, 1929 – Brazil
Erissus truncatifrons Simon, 1895 – Venezuela, Brazil
Erissus validus Simon, 1895 (type) – Peru, Brazil

See also
 List of Thomisidae species

References

Further reading

Araneomorphae genera
Spiders of South America
Thomisidae